Hunyadiscus andersoni is a species of air-breathing land snail, a terrestrial pulmonate gastropod mollusk in the family Plectopylidae.

Distribution
The distribution of Hunyadiscus andersoni includes Kachin State and Mandalay Region in Northern Myanmar and in Kakhyen Hills, Western Yunnan, China.

The type locality is "Bhamo in regno Avæ et Hoetone in Yunan".

References

External links

Plectopylidae
Gastropods described in 1869